An owner-operator is a small business or microbusiness owner who also runs the day-to-day operations of the company. Owner-operators are found in many business models and franchising companies in many different industries like restaurant chains, health care, logistics, maintenance, repair, and operations.

Trucking 
In the United States and Canada, the term typically refers to independent contractors who hire out and drive their own semi-trailer trucks. In trucking, an owner-operator is a self-employed commercial truck driver or a small business that operates trucks for transporting goods over highways for its customers. Most owner-operators become drivers for trucking companies first to gain experience and determine whether the career is for them.

The Motor Carrier Act of 1980 deregulated the industry and made it easier for manufacturers to set their own prices on shipping goods, and also allowed owner-operators to be more successful by taking some of the control out of the hands of the larger motor carriers. It was now possible to find a carrier willing to haul goods for what customers wanted to pay rather than what the larger carriers' rates were.

 An owner-operator is free to either haul free-lance (non-committal to any one firm or product) or enter into a lease agreement to dedicate their equipment to one customer or product
 The owner-operator typically has to pay higher rates on insurance due to smaller size than most larger companies, meaning they have to charge more to balance the cost
 There are many things to consider before becoming an owner-operator, including business setup, accounting, type of vehicle, and licenses

References

External links
 Owner-Operator Independent Drivers Association

Business models